Mikhail Vladimirovich Kupriyanov (born 7 July 1973) is a Russian professional football manager and a former player.

Playing career
He made his professional debut in the Soviet Second League in 1989 for FC Dynamo Makhachkala.

Honours
 Russian Premier League champion: 2001.
 Russian Cup finalist: 1994 (missed a penalty in the final game shootout).

European club competitions
With FC Rostselmash Rostov-on-Don.

 UEFA Intertoto Cup 1999: 4 games.
 UEFA Intertoto Cup 2000: 2 games.

References

1973 births
Footballers from Makhachkala
Living people
Soviet footballers
Russian footballers
Russia under-21 international footballers
Association football defenders
FC SKA Rostov-on-Don players
PFC CSKA Moscow players
Russian Premier League players
FC Rostov players
FC Anzhi Makhachkala players
FC Spartak Moscow players
FC Fakel Voronezh players
Russian football managers
FC SKA Rostov-on-Don managers
FC Dynamo Makhachkala players